Hans Metzler (born 22 February 1960) is a German bobsledder. He competed in the two man and the four man events at the 1984 Winter Olympics.

References

1960 births
Living people
German male bobsledders
Olympic bobsledders of West Germany
Bobsledders at the 1984 Winter Olympics
Sportspeople from Mainz